Tom Hammond (22 November 1896 – 16 July 1966) was  a former Australian rules footballer who played with Collingwood in the Victorian Football League (VFL).

Notes

External links 

		
Tom Hammond's profile at Collingwood Forever

1896 births
1966 deaths
Australian rules footballers from Victoria (Australia)
Collingwood Football Club players
Place of birth missing
Place of death missing